Deep-sea fish are fish that live in the darkness below the sunlit surface waters, that is below the epipelagic or photic zone of the sea. The lanternfish is, by far, the most common deep-sea fish. Other deep sea fishes include the flashlight fish, cookiecutter shark, bristlemouths, anglerfish, viperfish, and some species of eelpout.

Only about 2% of known marine species inhabit the pelagic environment. This means that they live in the water column as opposed to the benthic organisms that live in or on the sea floor. Deep-sea organisms generally inhabit bathypelagic (1000–4000 m deep) and abyssopelagic (4000–6000 m deep) zones. However, characteristics of deep-sea organisms, such as bioluminescence can be seen in the mesopelagic (200–1000 m deep) zone as well. The mesopelagic zone is the disphotic zone, meaning light there is minimal but still measurable. The oxygen minimum layer exists somewhere between a depth of 700 m and 1000 m deep depending on the place in the ocean. This area is also where nutrients are most abundant. The bathypelagic and abyssopelagic zones are aphotic, meaning that no light penetrates this area of the ocean. These zones make up about 75% of the inhabitable ocean space.

The epipelagic zone (0–200 m) is the area where light penetrates the water and photosynthesis occurs. This is also known as the photic zone. Because this typically extends only a few hundred meters below the water, the deep sea, about 90% of the ocean volume, is in darkness.

Environment

In the deep ocean, the waters extend far below the epipelagic zone, and support very different types of pelagic fishes adapted to living in these deeper zones. In deep water, marine snow is a continuous shower of mostly organic detritus falling from the upper layers of the water column. Its origin lies in activities within the productive photic zone. Marine snow includes dead or dying plankton, protists (diatoms), fecal matter, sand, soot and other inorganic dust. The "snowflakes" grow over time and may reach several centimetres in diameter, travelling for weeks before reaching the ocean floor. However, most organic components of marine snow are consumed by microbes, zooplankton and other filter-feeding animals within the first 1000 m of their journey, that is, within the epipelagic zone. In this way marine snow may be considered the foundation of deep-sea mesopelagic and benthic ecosystems: As sunlight cannot reach them, deep-sea organisms rely heavily on marine snow as an energy source. Since there is no light in the deep sea (aphotic), there is a lack of primary producers. Therefore, most organisms in the bathypelagic rely on the marine snow from regions higher in the vertical column. 

Some deep-sea pelagic groups, such as the lanternfish, ridgehead, marine hatchetfish, and lightfish families are sometimes termed pseudoceanic because, rather than having an even distribution in open water, they occur in significantly higher abundances around structural oases, notably seamounts and over continental slopes. The phenomenon is explained by the likewise abundance of prey species which are also attracted to the structures.

Hydrostatic pressure increases by 1 atm for every 10 m in depth. Deep-sea organisms have the same pressure within their bodies as is exerted on them from the outside, so they are not crushed by the extreme pressure. Their high internal pressure, however, results in the reduced fluidity of their membranes because molecules are squeezed together. Fluidity in cell membranes increases efficiency of biological functions, most importantly the production of proteins, so organisms have adapted to this circumstance by increasing the proportion of unsaturated fatty acids in the lipids of the cell membranes. In addition to differences in internal pressure, these organisms have developed a different balance between their metabolic reactions from those organisms that live in the epipelagic zone. David Wharton, author of Life at the Limits: Organisms in Extreme Environments, notes "Biochemical reactions are accompanied by changes in volume. If a reaction results in an increase in volume, it will be inhibited by pressure, whereas, if it is associated with a decrease in volume, it will be enhanced". This means that their metabolic processes must ultimately decrease the volume of the organism to some degree.

Most fish that have evolved in this harsh environment are not capable of surviving in laboratory conditions, and attempts to keep them in captivity have led to their deaths. Deep-sea organisms contain gas-filled spaces (vacuoles). Gas is compressed under high pressure and expands under low pressure. Because of this, these organisms have been known to blow up if they come to the surface.

Characteristics

The fish of the deep-sea have evolved various adaptations to survive in this region. Since many of these fish live in regions where there is no natural illumination, they cannot rely solely on their eyesight for locating prey and mates and avoiding predators; deep-sea fish have evolved appropriately to the extreme sub-photic region in which they live. Many of these organisms are blind and rely on their other senses, such as sensitivities to changes in local pressure and smell, to catch their food and avoid being caught. Those that aren't blind have large and sensitive eyes that can use bioluminescent light. These eyes can be as much as 100 times more sensitive to light than human eyes. Rhodopsin (Rh1) is a protein found in the eye’s rod cells that helps animals see in dim light. While most vertebrates usually have one Rh1 opsin gene, some deep sea fish have several Rh1 genes, and one species, the silver spinyfin (Diretmus argenteus), has 38. This proliferation of Rh1 genes may help deep sea fish to see in the depths of the ocean. Also, to avoid predation, many species are dark to blend in with their environment.

Many deep-sea fish are bioluminescent, with extremely large eyes adapted to the dark. Bioluminescent organisms are capable of producing light biologically through the agitation of molecules of luciferin, which then produce light. This process must be done in the presence of oxygen. These organisms are common in the mesopelagic region and below (200 m and below). More than 50% of deep-sea fish, as well as some species of shrimp and squid, are capable of bioluminescence. About 80% of these organisms have photophores – light producing glandular cells that contain luminous bacteria bordered by dark colourings. Some of these photophores contain lenses, much like those in the eyes of humans, which can intensify or lessen the emanation of light. The ability to produce light only requires 1% of the organism's energy and has many purposes: It is used to search for food and attract prey, like the anglerfish; claim territory through patrol; communicate and find a mate, and distract or temporarily blind predators to escape. Also, in the mesopelagic where some light still penetrates, some organisms camouflage themselves from predators below them by illuminating their bellies to match the colour and intensity of light from above so that no shadow is cast. This tactic is known as counter-illumination.

The lifecycle of deep-sea fish can be exclusively deep water although some species are born in shallower water and sink upon maturation. Regardless of the depth where eggs and larvae reside, they are typically pelagic. This planktonic — drifting — lifestyle requires neutral buoyancy. In order to maintain this, the eggs and larvae often contain oil droplets in their plasma. When these organisms are in their fully matured state they need other adaptations to maintain their positions in the water column. In general, water's density causes upthrust — the aspect of buoyancy that makes organisms float. To counteract this, the density of an organism must be greater than that of the surrounding water. Most animal tissues are denser than water, so they must find an equilibrium to make them float. Many organisms develop swim bladders (gas cavities) to stay afloat, but because of the high pressure of their environment, deep-sea fishes usually do not have this organ. Instead they exhibit structures similar to hydrofoils in order to provide hydrodynamic lift. It has also been found that the deeper a fish lives, the more jelly-like its flesh and the more minimal its bone structure. They reduce their tissue density through high fat content, reduction of skeletal weight — accomplished through reductions of size, thickness and mineral content — and water accumulation makes them slower and less agile than surface fish.

Due to the poor level of photosynthetic light reaching deep-sea environments, most fish need to rely on organic matter sinking from higher levels, or, in rare cases, hydrothermal vents for nutrients. This makes the deep-sea much poorer in productivity than shallower regions. Also, animals in the pelagic environment are sparse and food doesn't come along frequently. Because of this, organisms need adaptations that allow them to survive. Some have long feelers to help them locate prey or attract mates in the pitch black of the deep ocean. The deep-sea angler fish in particular has a long fishing-rod-like adaptation protruding from its face, on the end of which is a bioluminescent piece of skin that wriggles like a worm to lure its prey. Some must consume other fish that are the same size or larger than them and they need adaptations to help digest them efficiently. Great sharp teeth, hinged jaws, disproportionately large mouths, and expandable bodies are a few of the characteristics that deep-sea fishes have for this purpose. The gulper eel is one example of an organism that displays these characteristics.

Fish in the different pelagic and deep water benthic zones are physically structured, and behave in ways, that differ markedly from each other. Groups of coexisting species within each zone all seem to operate in similar ways, such as the small mesopelagic vertically migrating plankton-feeders, the bathypelagic anglerfishes, and the deep water benthic rattails.

Ray finned species, with spiny fins, are rare among deep sea fishes, which suggests that deep sea fish are ancient and so well adapted to their environment that invasions by more modern fishes have been unsuccessful. The few ray fins that do exist are mainly in the Beryciformes and Lampriformes, which are also ancient forms. Most deep sea pelagic fishes belong to their own orders, suggesting a long evolution in deep sea environments. In contrast, deep water benthic species, are in orders that include many related shallow water fishes.

Mesopelagic fish

Below the epipelagic zone, conditions change rapidly. Between 200 m and about 1000 m, light continues to fade until there is almost none. Temperatures fall through a thermocline to temperatures between 3.9 °C (39 °F) and 7.8 °C (46 °F). This is the twilight or mesopelagic zone. Pressure continues to increase, at the rate of one atm every 10 m, while nutrient concentrations fall, along with dissolved oxygen and the rate at which the water circulates.

Sonar operators, using the newly developed sonar technology during World War II, were puzzled by what appeared to be a false sea floor 300–500 m deep at day, and less deep at night. This turned out to be due to millions of marine organisms, most particularly small mesopelagic fish, with swim bladders that reflected the sonar. These organisms migrate up into shallower water at dusk to feed on plankton. The layer is deeper when the moon is out, and can become shallower when clouds pass over the moon. This phenomenon has come to be known as the deep scattering layer.

Most mesopelagic fish make daily vertical migrations, moving at night into the epipelagic zone, often following similar migrations of zooplankton, and returning to the depths for safety during the day. These vertical migrations often occur over large vertical distances, and are undertaken with the assistance of a swim bladder. The swim bladder is inflated when the fish wants to move up, and, given the high pressures in the messoplegic zone, this requires significant energy. As the fish ascends, the pressure in the swim bladder must adjust to prevent it from bursting. When the fish wants to return to the depths, the swim bladder is deflated. Some mesopelagic fishes make daily migrations through the thermocline, where the temperature changes between 50 °F (10 °C) and 69 °F (20 °C), thus displaying considerable tolerances for temperature change.

These fish have muscular bodies, ossified bones, scales, well developed gills and central nervous systems, and large hearts and kidneys. Mesopelagic plankton feeders have small mouths with fine gill rakers, while the piscivores have larger mouths and coarser gill rakers.

Mesopelagic fish are adapted for an active life under low light conditions. Most of them are visual predators with large eyes. Some of the deeper water fish have tubular eyes with big lenses and only rod cells that look upwards. These give binocular vision and great sensitivity to small light signals. This adaptation gives improved terminal vision at the expense of lateral vision, and allows the predator to pick out squid, cuttlefish, and smaller fish that are silhouetted against the gloom above them.

Mesopelagic fish usually lack defensive spines, and use colour to camouflage themselves from other fish. Ambush predators are dark, black or red. Since the longer, red, wavelengths of light do not reach the deep sea, red effectively functions the same as black. Migratory forms use countershaded silvery colours. On their bellies, they often display photophores producing low grade light. For a predator from below, looking upwards, this bioluminescence camouflages the silhouette of the fish. However, some of these predators have yellow lenses that filter the (red deficient) ambient light, leaving the bioluminescence visible.

The brownsnout spookfish, a species of barreleye, is the only vertebrate known to employ a mirror, as opposed to a lens, to focus an image in its eyes.

Sampling by deep trawling indicates that lanternfish account for as much as 65% of all deep-sea fish biomass. Indeed, lanternfish are among the most widely distributed, populous, and diverse of all vertebrates, playing an important ecological role as prey for larger organisms. The estimated global biomass of lanternfish is 550–660 million tonnes, several times the entire world fisheries catch. Lanternfish also account for much of the biomass responsible for the deep scattering layer of the world's oceans.

Bigeye tuna are an epipelagic/mesopelagic species that eats other fish. Satellite tagging has shown that bigeye tuna often spend prolonged periods cruising deep below the surface during the daytime, sometimes making dives as deep as 500 m. These movements are thought to be in response to the vertical migrations of prey organisms in the deep scattering layer.

Bathypelagic fish

Below the mesopelagic zone it is pitch dark. This is the midnight (or bathypelagic zone), extending from 1000 m to the bottom deep water benthic zone. If the water is exceptionally deep, the pelagic zone below 4000 m is sometimes called the lower midnight (or abyssopelagic zone). Temperatures in this zone range from 1 to 4 degrees celsius and is completely aphotic. 

Conditions are somewhat uniform throughout these zones; the darkness is complete, the pressure is crushing, and temperatures, nutrients and dissolved oxygen levels are all low.

Bathypelagic fish have special adaptations to cope with these conditions – they have slow metabolisms and unspecialized diets, being willing to eat anything that comes along. They prefer to sit and wait for food rather than waste energy searching for it. The behaviour of bathypelagic fish can be contrasted with the behaviour of mesopelagic fish. Mesopelagic fish are often highly mobile, whereas bathypelagic fish are almost all lie-in-wait predators, normally expending little energy in movement.

The dominant bathypelagic fishes are small bristlemouth and anglerfish; fangtooth, viperfish, daggertooth and barracudina are also common. These fishes are small, many about 10 cm long, and not many longer than 25 cm. They spend most of their time waiting patiently in the water column for prey to appear or to be lured by their phosphors. What little energy is available in the bathypelagic zone filters from above in the form of detritus, faecal material, and the occasional invertebrate or mesopelagic fish. About 20 percent of the food that has its origins in the epipelagic zone falls down to the mesopelagic zone, but only about 5 percent filters down to the bathypelagic zone.

Bathypelagic fish are sedentary, adapted to outputting minimum energy in a habitat with very little food or available energy, not even sunlight, only bioluminescence. Their bodies are elongated with weak, watery muscles and skeletal structures. Since so much of the fish is water, they are not compressed by the great pressures at these depths. They often have extensible, hinged jaws with recurved teeth. They are slimy, without scales. The central nervous system is confined to the lateral line and olfactory systems, the eyes are small and may not function, and gills, kidneys and hearts, and swim bladders are small or missing.

These are the same features found in fish larvae, which suggests that during their evolution, bathypelagic fish have acquired these features through neoteny. As with larvae, these features allow the fish to remain suspended in the water with little expenditure of energy.

Despite their ferocious appearance, these beasts of the deep are mostly miniature fish with weak muscles, and are too small to represent any threat to humans.

The swim bladders of deep sea fish are either absent or scarcely operational, and bathypelagic fish do not normally undertake vertical migrations. Filling bladders at such great pressures incurs huge energy costs. Some deep sea fishes have swim bladders which function while they are young and inhabit the upper epipelagic zone, but they wither or fill with fat when the fish move down to their adult habitat.

The most important sensory systems are usually the inner ear, which responds to sound, and the lateral line, which responds to changes in water pressure. The olfactory system can also be important for males who find females by smell.
Bathypelagic fish are black, or sometimes red, with few photophores. When photophores are used, it is usually to entice prey or attract a mate. Because food is so scarce, bathypelagic predators are not selective in their feeding habits, but grab whatever comes close enough. They accomplish this by having a large mouth with sharp teeth for grabbing large prey and overlapping gill rakers which prevent small prey that have been swallowed from escaping.

It is not easy finding a mate in this zone. Some species depend on bioluminescence, where bioluminescent patterns are unique to specific species. Others are hermaphrodites, which doubles their chances of producing both eggs and sperm when an encounter occurs. The female anglerfish releases pheromones to attract tiny males. When a male finds her, he bites on to her and never lets go. When a male of the anglerfish species Haplophryne mollis bites into the skin of a female, he releases an enzyme that digests the skin of his mouth and her body, fusing the pair to the point where the two circulatory systems join up. The male then atrophies into nothing more than a pair of gonads. This extreme sexual dimorphism ensures that, when the female is ready to spawn, she has a mate immediately available.

Many forms other than fish live in the bathypelagic zone, such as squid, large whales, octopuses, sponges, brachiopods, sea stars, and echinoids, but this zone is difficult for fish to live in.

Adaptation to high pressure
As a fish moves deeper into the sea, the weight of the water overhead exerts increasing hydrostatic pressure on the fish. This increased pressure amounts to about one atm for every 10 m in depth. For a fish at the bottom of the bathypelagic zone, this pressure amounts to about 400 atm (nearly 6000 pounds per square inch). 

Deep sea organisms possess adaptations at cellular and physiological levels that allow them to survive in environments of great pressure. Not having these adaptations limits the depths at which shallow-water species can operate. High levels of external pressure affects how metabolic processes and biochemical reactions proceed. The equilibrium of many chemical reactions is disturbed by pressure, and pressure can inhibit processes which result in an increase in volume. Water, a key component in many biological processes, is very susceptible to volume changes, mainly because constituents of cellular fluid have an effect on water structure. Thus, enzymatic reactions that induce changes in water organization effectively change the system's volume. Proteins responsible for catalyzing reactions are typically held together by weak bonds and the reactions usually involve volume increases.

To adapt to this change, the protein structure and reaction criteria of deep sea fish have been adapted to withstand pressure in order to perform reactions in these conditions. In high pressure environments, bilayer cellular membranes experience a loss of fluidity. Deep-sea cellular membranes favor phospholipid bilayers with a higher proportion of unsaturated fatty acids, which induce a higher fluidity than their sea-level counterparts.

Deep sea species exhibit lower changes of entropy and enthalpy compared to surface level organisms, since a high pressure and low temperature environment favors negative enthalpy changes and reduced dependence on entropy-driven reactions. From a structural standpoint, globular proteins of deep sea fish due to the tertiary structure of G-actin are relatively rigid compared to those of surface level fish. The fact that proteins in deep sea fish are structurally different from surface fish is apparent from the observation that actin from the muscle fibers of deep sea fish are extremely heat resistant; an observation similar to what is found in lizards. These proteins are structurally strengthened by modification of the bonds in the tertiary structure of the protein which also happens to induce high levels of thermal stability. Proteins are structurally strengthened to resist pressure by modification of bonds in the tertiary structure. Therefore, high levels of hydrostatic pressure, similar to high body temperatures of thermophilic desert reptiles, favor rigid protein structures.

Na+/K+ -ATPase is a lipoprotein enzyme that plays a prominent role in osmoregulation and is heavily influenced by hydrostatic pressure. The inhibition of Na+/K+ -ATPase is due to increased compression due to pressure. The rate-limiting step of the Na+/K+ -ATPase reaction induces an expansion in the bilayer surrounding the protein, and therefore an increase in volume. An increase in volume makes Na+/K+ -ATPase reactivity susceptible to higher pressures. Even though the Na+/K+ -ATPase activity per gram of gill tissue is lower for deep sea fishes, the Na+/K+ -ATPases of deep sea fishes exhibit a much higher tolerance of hydrostatic pressure compared to their shallow-water counterparts. This is exemplified between the species C. acrolepis (around 2000 m deep) and its hadalpelagic counterpart C. armatus (around 4000 m deep), where the Na+/K+ -ATPases of C. armatus are much less sensitive to pressure. This resistance to pressure can be explained by adaptations in the protein and lipid moieties of Na+/K+ -ATPase.

Lanternfish

Sampling via deep trawling indicates that lanternfish account for as much as 65% of all deep-sea fish biomass. Indeed, lanternfish are among the most widely distributed, populous, and diverse of all vertebrates, playing an important ecological role as prey for larger organisms. With an estimated global biomass of 550–660 million metric tons, several times the entire world fisheries catch, lanternfish also account for much of the biomass responsible for the deep scattering layer of the world's oceans. In the Southern Ocean, Myctophids provide an alternative food resource to krill for predators such as squid and the king penguin. Although these fish are plentiful and prolific, currently only a few commercial lanternfish fisheries exist: these include limited operations off South Africa, in the sub-Antarctic, and in the Gulf of Oman.

Endangered species
A 2006 study by Canadian scientists has found five species of deep-sea fish – blue hake, spiny eel – to be on the verge of extinction due to the shift of commercial fishing from continental shelves to the slopes of the continental shelves, down to depths of 1600 m. The slow reproduction of these fish – they reach sexual maturity at about the same age as human beings – is one of the main reasons that they cannot recover from the excessive fishing.

See also

 Census of Marine Life
 Deep ocean water
 Deep sea
 Deep sea communities
 Deep water fish
 Demersal fish
 Pelagic fish

Citations

References

Further reading
 Gordon J. D. M. (2001) "Deep-sea fishes" In: John H. Steele, Steve A. Thorpe, Karl K. Turekian (eds.) Elements of Physical Oceanography, pages 227–233, Academic Press. .
 Hoar W. S., Randall D. J. and Farrell A. P. (eds.) (1997) Deep-Sea Fishes, Academic Press. .
 Shotton, Ross (1995) "Deepwater fisheries" In: Review of the state of world marine fishery resources, FAO Fisheries technical paper 457, FAO, Rome. .
 Tandstad M., Shotton R., Sanders J. and Carocci F. (2011) "Deep-sea Fisheries" In: Review of the state of world marine fishery resources, pages 265–278, FAO Fisheries technical paper 569, FAO, Rome. .

External links

 https://www.pbs.org/wgbh/nova/abyss/life/bestiary.html
 http://ocean.nationalgeographic.com/ocean/photos/deep-sea-creatures/
 Deep Sea Creatures - Articles, facts and images of deep sea animals

Deep sea fish
Articles containing video clips
Oceanographical terminology
Ichthyology